Jerry Drake may refer to:
Jerry Drake, alter ego of Mister No
Jerry Drake (American football) (born 1969), American football player